This is an extended usage of word gridlock specifically in economics to describe the common situation that occurs in the competition within an industry or a company. The similar usage of gridlock can be seen in politics as well. See also gridlock (Politics). However, the term gridlock was first used in engineering as, "A state of severe road congestion arising when continuous queues of vehicles block an entire network of intersecting streets, bringing traffic in all directions to a complete standstill; a traffic jam of this kind."

In microeconomics, gridlock refers to the difficult situation of firms to invest in long-term and sustainable business, especially in a fiercely competitive industry where most firms focus on the short-term returns. It is very hard for any player to make move towards sustainable and health direction, since if one party initiates the long-term investment, which is not very profitable in the short-term, the other competitors can easily take advantage of the situation to outcompete that firm, and even drive that firm out of market. As a result, no party will take the risk to make a move. This phenomenon is also called first-mover disadvantage. In the end, the unhealthy situation of the industry can be hardly improved by the market leaders themselves. In the business as in traffic, when gridlock happens, an industry is unable to function at a healthy level, which can be highly problematic and costly.

Not only in an industry, gridlock can also happen at company level. If there are several groups with conflicting interests exist within one company competing to gain the control and power, this can create a situation in which business transactions can not be completed until the problem is solved.

This kind of dilemma is also very often cited in game theory. If all the parties can cooperate, for example, companies can collaboratively invest in a sustainable way, the gridlock can be easily solved and the industry will function in a healthy way. But this is not happening because of the desire to maximize one's own benefit given the uncertainty about the others’ commitment to cooperation.

Solution 

Naturally to solve this problem, it requires institutions within the industry or company to regulate rules and prevent the inefficient situation to happen. Thus institution plays a role of traffic lights or traffic police in the conjunction of business world.

In the book Institutional Economics an introduction, professor John Groenewegen, Antoon Spithoven and Annette van den Berg explained approaches of analyzing this kind of situation and suggest the solutions to similar problems from institutional prospective. See also Institutional economics.

References 

Competition (economics)
Game theory